"Give Me a Reason" is a song recorded by the British pop/rock group Triple 8 in 2003. It was released as a single on 21 July 2003 in the United Kingdom. The single debuted at a peak position of number 9 in the UK Singles Chart.

Track listing
CD 1
"Give Me a Reason" 3:28
"The Best I Never Had" 3:32
"Give Me a Reason" (K-Warren remix) 5:01
"Give Me a Reason" (Video) 3:25
Behind the scenes interview (Video) 1:59

CD 2
"Give Me a Reason" 3:28
"Upside" 3:15
"Give Me a Reason" (Bastone & Burnz club mix) 7:15
Triple 8 Home Movie (Video) 1:59

Charts

References

2003 singles
Triple 8 songs
Songs written by David Eriksen
Songs written by Wayne Hector
2003 songs
Polydor Records singles